Club Omnisports Modèle de Lomé is a Togolese football and basketball club based in Lomé. They play in the Togolese Second Division.

In 1966 the team has won the Togolese Championnat National.

Stadium
Their home stadium is Stade Agoè-Nyivé.

Achievements
Togolese Championnat National
Champions (4): 1966, 1969, 1972, 1973

Performance in CAF competitions
 African Cup of Champions Clubs: 2 appearances
1967 – First Round
1973 – First Round

References

External links

Team profile – worldfootball.net

Football clubs in Togo
Football clubs in Lomé
Association football clubs established in 1935
1935 establishments in French Togoland